John Archibald McDonald (February 25, 1851 – February 17, 1925) was a lawyer and political figure in Nova Scotia, Canada. He represented Victoria County in the Nova Scotia Legislative Assembly as a Conservative from 1882 to 1886, and Victoria in the House of Commons of Canada from 1887 to 1896. Although a Conservative, he ran as a Liberal in a November 1887 by-election resulting from his election at the general election the previous March having been declared void, and thus sat as such from November 1887 to March 1891.

He was born in North East Margaree, Nova Scotia, the son of Laughlin McDonald, a Scottish immigrant. He was educated at the Horton Academy and then Acadia College. McDonald was called to the Nova Scotia bar in 1877. In 1885, he married Katie Jeannette Hume. He represented Victoria County in the Nova Scotia House of Assembly from 1882 to 1886 as a Conservative. McDonald was also a trustee for the Baddeck Academy and municipal clerk for Victoria. His election to the House of Commons in 1887 was declared void and he was elected as a Liberal later that year. McDonald was elected as a Conservative in the 1891 general election. That election was declared void but he was elected again in the subsequent by-election.

References 
The Canadian parliamentary companion, 1889, JA Gemmill
 

1851 births
1925 deaths
Progressive Conservative Association of Nova Scotia MLAs
Members of the House of Commons of Canada from Nova Scotia
Conservative Party of Canada (1867–1942) MPs
Liberal Party of Canada MPs
People from Baddeck, Nova Scotia